Prince Giorgi Mikhailovitch Shervashidze, titular Prince of Abkhazia (b. 1846, d. 1918) was the son of Mikhail, Prince of Abkhazia. He was educated at the Page Corps, Saint Petersburg. Aide-de-camp to Grand Duke Michael Nikolaevich of Russia 1866.

Proclaimed as Prince of Abkhazia at Sukhumi, by the people after an uprising against the Russians, 29 July 1866. Arrested and deported to Orenburg.

He was granted the right to return to Abkhazia in 1905. He lived the rest of his life in Kutaisi.

Ancestry

References

|-

|-

|-

1846 births
1918 deaths
Princes of Abkhazia
Giorgi Mikhailovitch
Honorary Knights Grand Cross of the Royal Victorian Order